Sonia Kapoor Reshammiya  is an Indian television and film actress who has appeared in many television series and Bollywood films.
She married Bollywood actor, singer, music director Himesh Reshammiya on 11 May 2018 in a private ceremony in Mumbai.

Television

Kahiin To Hoga as Ritika
Sanjivani as Madhu 
Maa Shakti as Goddess Ganga in Hinduism
Kittie Party as Ruksana
Aa Gale Lag Jaa as Priti
 2005 Piya Ka Ghar as Shweta Avinash Sharma 
Kabhie Kabhie as Neelu Nigam
 2002 Kkusum as Naina Bajaj
Kabhi Haan Kabhi Kabhi Naa as Avantika
Sati...Satya Ki Shakti as Sanika
Zaara as Zaara
Remix as Sonia Ray
Parrivaar as Sangamitra Shergill
Kaisa Ye Pyar Hai as Naina Khanna
Babul Ki Duwayen Leti Jaa as Preeti
Jugni Chali Jalandhar as Manjeet Bhalla
Neeli Aankhen as Neelu Nigam
Krishnaben Khakhrawala as Mitali Kapoor
Love U Zindagi as Mitali Kapoor
1999 : Jai Ganesha(Zee TV) as Goddess Lakshmi
 1997 - 2000 Jai Hanuman as Mandodari
Heena as Nameera
Shri Krishna as Subhadra
 Karma as Gayatri (Guru Maa)
 Shagun 
Kumkum - Ek Pyara Sa Bandhan as Inspector Revati
 Neeli Aankhen as Neha Oberoi
 2001 Woh Koun Thi as rani Devyani(Episode 14)
 Dushman

Filmography

Lyricist

References

External links
 
 

Living people
Indian television actresses
Indian soap opera actresses
Indian film actresses
Actors from Mumbai
Year of birth missing (living people)